Cerro de Charo is a hill in the Province of Huesca, northeastern Spain. It has an elevation of 994 metres.

Geography of the Province of Huesca
Mountains of the Pyrenees